Joel Leandro Ordóñez Guerrero (born 21 April 2004) is an Ecuadorian professional footballer who plays as a centre-back for the Belgian club Club NXT.

Professional career
Ordóñez is a youth product of Deportivo Azogues and Independiente del Valle. He began his senior career with Independiente del Valle in 2022. He made his senior and professional debut them in a 0–0 Ecuadorian Serie A draw with Guayaquil City on 9 April 2022. After making 11 senior appearances with Independiente del Valle, he transferred to the Belgian club Club NXT on 2 August 2022. On 19 August 2022, he was promoted to Club Brugge senior team.

International career
Ordóñez first represented Ecuador internationally with the Ecuador U15s as captain at the 2019 South American U-15 Championship. He was called up to the Ecuador U20s for the South American Youth Football Championship, but was not released by his club for the tournament.

References

External links
 
 Pro League profile

2004 births
Living people
Sportspeople from Guayaquil
Ecuadorian footballers
Ecuador youth international footballers
Association football defenders
C.S.D. Independiente del Valle footballers
Club Brugge KV players
Club NXT players
Ecuadorian Serie A players
Challenger Pro League players
Ecuadorian expatriate footballers
Expatriate footballers in Belgium
Ecuadorian expatriate sportspeople in Belgium